The Government Technical Institute, Pyay was an Institute of technology and engineering located in Pyay, Bago Division, Burma. It could graduate only Diploma of Technical.

The Government Technical Institute (Pyay) was a place where some Burmese politicians, such as Ko Ko Gyi and Kyaw Zaw Oo, did their post-high-school studies.

History 
The Government Technical Institute (Pyay) was founded in 1972. During military junta days, its campus was taken by the government.

Departments 
Department of Civil Engineering
Department of Electronic and Communication Engineering
Department of Electrical Power Engineering

Programs

See also
Yenangyaung Government Technical Institute

References

External links
the Department of Technical and Vocational Education and Training

Technological universities in Myanmar